Rupinder Nagra is an actor who has been working internationally in Canada, India and the UK. He was a nominee for Best Actor at the 29th Genie Awards for his role in the film Amal.

In January 2016, he appeared as "father" in My Brothers & Sisters, a play about radicalisation, at the Sarah Siddons Theatre, London. The play was produced by Mad'Ed Theatre and directed by Darren Luke Mawdsley.

He was raised in Hamilton, Ontario.

Filmography
Amal as Amal
Kurbaan as Hamid
Raees as Ali
Simran as Mike
Omerta as Maulana Ismail

References

External links
 Rupinder Nagra website
 

Year of birth missing (living people)
Living people
Canadian male film actors
Canadian people of Indian descent
Male actors from Hamilton, Ontario
Canadian male actors of Indian descent